Para red (paranitraniline red, Pigment Red 1, C.I. 12070) is a dye. Chemically, it is similar to Sudan I.  It was discovered in 1880 by von Gallois and Ullrich and was the first azo dye. It dyes cellulose fabrics a brilliant red color, but is not very fast. The dye can be washed away easily from cellulose fabrics if not dyed correctly. Acidic and basic stages both occur during the standard formation of Para Red, and acidic or basic byproducts may be present in the final product.

Synthesis
Para red is prepared by diazotization of para-nitroaniline at ice-cold temperatures, followed by coupling with β-naphthol:

Regulation
Para red is not approved for use in food in any jurisdiction. In 2005, Old El Paso dinner kits were found to be contaminated with the dye and removed from supermarket shelves.

References

External links
 MSDS at Oxford University

Azo dyes
Nitrobenzenes
2-Naphthols